Mariposa orchid, literally "butterfly" orchid in Spanish, can refer to:
Phalaenopsis amabilis, also called the "moon orchid" or "moth orchid", a species of orchid native to the Philippines, Indonesia, and Malaysia
Phalaenopsis, moth orchids in general
Psychopsis 'Mariposa', a hybrid orchid from South America